Romeo Juliet is an Indian Odia-language romance comedy featured film directed by Sudhakar Vasanth. The film stars Arindam Roy and Barsha Priyadarshini. The cast also includes Dipika Tripathy, Mihir Das and Prativa Panda.

Cast
 Arindam Roy
 Barsha Priyadarshini
 Dipika Tripathy
 Mihir Das 
 Prativa Panda

References 

2010s Odia-language films